Jinshi was the highest and final degree in the imperial examination in Imperial China. The examination was usually taken in the imperial capital in the palace, and was also called the Metropolitan Exam. Recipients are sometimes referred to in English-language sources as Imperial Scholars.

The jinshi degree was first created after the institutionalization of the civil service exam. Initially it had been "for six categories" but was later consolidated into a single degree. This system first appeared during the Han Dynasty (206 BC – 220 AD). Throughout the Tang Dynasty, every year around one to two percent of test takers would obtain a jinshi title out of a total of one to two thousand test takers.

The numbers of Jinshi degrees given out were increased in the Song Dynasty, and the examinations were given every three years. Most senior officials of the Song Dynasty were jinshi holders.

The Ming Dynasty resumed the civil-service exam after its occurrence became more irregular in the Yuan Dynasty. After the reign of the Emperor Yingzong of Ming, it became the rule that only jinshi holders could enter the Hanlin Academy. On average around 89 jinshi per year were conferred.

During the Qing dynasty around 102 jinshi degrees were given a year.

The highest scoring jinshi in the country was known as the zhuangyuan, a term that survives today as a high scoring gaokao test taker or just someone who is very good at a skill.

Subtypes of jinshi recipients
 Jinshi Jidi (進士及第, lit. "distinguished jinshi"), graduates ranked first class in the court exam, usually only the top three individuals were qualified for this title.
 Zhuangyuan (狀元, lit. "top thesis author"), the jinshi who ranked first overall nationwide.
 Bangyan (榜眼, lit. "eyes positioned alongside"), the jinshi who ranked second overall just below zhuangyuan.
 Tanhua (探花, lit. "flower snatcher"), the jinshi ranked third overall.
 Jinshi Chushen (進士出身, lit. "jinshi background"), the graduates who ranked second class in court exam, ranking immediately after the tanhua.
 Tong Jinshi Chushen (同進士出身, lit. "along with jinshi background"), graduates ranked third class in the court exam.

Notable jinshi recipients by year

Tang Dynasty
 Chen Zi'ang, (c. 685) poet who was important in helping to bring into being the type of poetry which is considered to be characteristically "Tang"
 Wang Changling (7??)
 Meng Jiao (7??)
 Lu Lun (7??)
 Yan Zhenqing (734), famed calligrapher
 Cen Shen (744)
 Liu Changqing (750s)
 Yuan Jie (754) 
 Han Hong (poet) (754)
 Ouyang Zhan (792) 
 Liu Yuxi (793)
 Li Ao (philosopher) (798)
 Cao Que (803)
 Li Guyan (812)
 Ma Zhi (819)
 Xiahou Zi (826)
 Xiao Fang (827)
 Du Mu (828) 
 Xiao Qing (8??)
 Wei Cong (8??)
 Yu Cong (8??)
 Song Shenxi (8??) 
 Lu Guangqi (8??)
 Sun Wo (8??)
 Pei Zhi (8??)
 Wang Pu (Tang dynasty) (8??)
 Pei Tan (9th-century Tang chancellor) (8??)
 Wei Fu (830)
 Du Shenquan (833-873)
 Cui Yanzhao (849)
 Yu Wuling (85?)
 Wang Hui (Tang dynasty) (858)
 Xiao Gou (864)
 Pi Rixiu (867)
 Pei Shu (871)
 Yang She (875)
 Ni Shu (877)
 Xue Yiju (87?)
 Zhao Guangyin (891)
 Shen Song (895)
 Wang Dingbao (900)
 Ma Yinsun (9??)
 Cui Xie (???)
 Liu Kai (Song dynasty) (973)

Song Dynasty
 Song Di (Fugu) (10??)
 Bao Zheng (1028)
 Cai Xiang (1030) 
 Ouyang Xiu (1030) 
 Chen Yuyi (1113)
 Qin Hui (1115) 
 Yang Wanli (1154)
 Lu Zhi (poet) (1269)

Yuan dynasty
 Liu Bowen (c.1350)

Ming dynasty
 Yu Qian (1421)
 Han Yong (Ming dynasty) (1422)
 Yang Tinghe (1478)
 Xu Pu (1454)
 Lu Rong (1466)
 Wang Yangming (1499)
 Yan Song (1505)
 Zhu Wan (1521)
 Xu Jie (Ming dynasty) (1523)
 Luo Hongxian (1529)
 Zhao Wenhua (1529)
 Qian Dehong (1532)
 Fan Qin (1532)
 Gao Gong (1541)
 Liang Youyu (1550)
 Xu Zhongxing (1550)
 Gui Youguang, (1565) nine attempts
 Tang Xianzu, ( 1571) playwright and government official
 Li Shida (1574)
 Li Sancai (1574)
 Zang Maoxun (1580)
 Ye Xianggao (1583)
 Zhu Guozhen (Ming dynasty) (1589)
 Hong Chengchou (1616)
 Ruan Dacheng (1616)
 Ni Yuanlu (1621)
 Shi Kefa (1628)
 Sun Chuanting (1619)
 Liu Tong (1634)
 Zhou Lianggong, (1640) artist, calligrapher, and government official
 Zhao Yingcheng, (1646) scholar and mandarin of Jewish faith
 Han Weiji (1664)

Qing dynasty
 Jiang Tingxi (16??)
 Wei Yijie (1646)
 Chen Tingjing (1658), politician and scholar, tutor to the Kangxi Emperor and editor of the Kangxi Dictionary
 Guwen Guanzhi (1658)
 Ye Fang'ai (1659)
 Chen Menglei (1670)
 Xu Qianxue (1670)
 Li Guangdi (1670)
 Wang Hongxu (1673)
 Zhang Boxing (1685)
 Chen Pengnian (1691)
 Nian Gengyao (1700)
 Zhang Tingyu (1700), politician and historian, one of the first members of the Grand Council (Qing dynasty)
 Akdun (1709)
 Zhang Zhao (1709)
After holding various posts, in 1741 Sun became Viceroy of Huguang, where he introduced the system of subsidized chiefs, in order to keep the aborigines under control.
 Liu Tongxun (1724)
 Yuan Mei (1739)
 Wei Yijie (1646) (魏裔介; 1616 – 1686) a prominent Han Chinese scholar and official serving in the early Qing Dynasty, during the rules of the Shunzhi Emperor, Oboi, and the Kangxi Emperor and was known for his focus and advocacy of the reformation the examination system
 Ji Yun (1754)
 Sun Shiyi (1761)
 Yao Nai (1763)
 Sun Yuting (1775)
 Ruan Yuan (1789)
 Gao E (writer) (1795)
 Lu Kun (1799)
 Bao Shichen (1808)
 Cheng Enze (1811)
 Lin Zexu (1811)
 Ge Yunfei (1823) 
 Huang Juezi (1823)
 Luo Bingzhang (1832)
 Luo Zundian (1835) 
 Zeng Guofan (1838)
 Feng Guifen (1840)
 Jiang Zhongyuan (1844), courtesy name Changrui, was a scholar and soldier from Hunan who fought for the Qing and against the Taiping Heavenly Kingdom during the Taiping Rebellion.
 Wenxiang (1845)
 Xue Fucheng (1845)
 Ma Xinyi (1847)
 Li Hongzhang (1847)
 Tan Zhonglin (1856)
 Lao Chongguang (18??)
 Liu Bingzhang (1860)
 Cuigiya Lianyuan (1868)
 Xu Jingcheng (1868)
 Qu Hongji (1871)
 Zhao Erxun (1874)
 Zuo Zongtang (1875), granted an "honorary jinshi" by the Guangxu Emperor for his military achievements 
 Shen Jiaben (1883)
 Liang Qichao (1890)
 Huang Xing (1893)
 Wu Leichuan (1898)
 Xu Qian (1903)
 Theodone C. Hu (1906)

People who failed jinshi exams
 Wu Cheng (philosopher)
 Li Zhen (Later Liang)
 Li Yu (Later Tang)
 Feng Yu

See also
 Qing literati
 Shujishi

Notes

References

Academic degrees
Confucian education
Imperial examination
Political history of China